Patrick Schmölzer (born 11 January 1984) is an Austrian former professional tennis player.

Schmölzer, a Styrian native, reached a best singles world ranking of 564. He featured in three ATP Tour main draws for doubles, competing twice at Kitzbühel and once at Stuttgart. He plays for TC Gleisdorf in the Austrian Bundesliga.

ITF Futures titles

Doubles: (2)

References

External links
 
 

1984 births
Living people
Austrian male tennis players
Sportspeople from Styria